Tonosawa Dam is an earthfill dam located in Yamagata Prefecture in Japan. The dam is used for irrigation. The catchment area of the dam is  km2. The dam impounds about 1  ha of land when full and can store 67 thousand cubic meters of water. The construction of the dam was completed in 1988.

References

Dams in Yamagata Prefecture
1988 establishments in Japan